Thomas Jesse Yarnell, known as Jesse Yarnell, (1837–1906) was a California newspaperman who established the Los Angeles, California, Weekly Mirror, which took over the Los Angeles Times in 1881 and later merged with it.

Biography 
Yarnell was born in Gratiot, Ohio, on June 20, 1837, and learned the printing trade in Zanesville in that state.

California
He came to California in 1862 and established the Daily News in Placerville. He and Susan Caystile were married there.
In 1866 he moved south to Los Angeles, where he founded the Weekly Republican newspaper, which he later sold to a brother-in-law. It later merged with the Evening Express. He next founded the Weekly Mirror in Los Angeles.

Yarnell was a candidate on  the Prohibition party ticket for an at-large Congressional seat in the 1882 election, but lost. In 1902, he was nominated by the Prohibitionists  for a seat in the California State Assembly but campaigned unsuccessfully as an independent.

He died on January 19, 1906. He was survived by his widow, Susan Caystile Yarnell, their son Ellis, and their three daughters, Jessie, Catherine and Esther Yarnell. He also had a brother, George. Yarnell left an estate of about $50,000, the largest item being a 204-acre ranch in Buena Park, California, valued at $30,000.

See also

 List of Los Angeles Times publishers

References

External links
 "The Times' 128-Year History," Los Angeles Times Media Group

Journalists from California
Writers from Los Angeles
1906 deaths
1837 births
People from Los Angeles
People from Buena Park, California
People from Gratiot, Ohio
Journalists from Ohio
People from Placerville, California